Chewy: Esc from F5 is a 1995 point-and-click adventure released for MS-DOS compatible operating systems in 1995. A Microsoft Windows version followed in 1997.

Plot
The game is about a cute pink alien called Chewy, who along with his partner Clint goes on a mission to break into the Borxian high security zone called F5, to steal the powerful "Red Glump" so that the Borx can't use it for their evil plans. Chewy's partner Clint manages to steal the glump and escapes with it from the pursuing Borkian starships, but his spaceship gets caught in a wormhole during the chase and crashes on a planet called Earth.

Gameplay
The game is a point-and-click adventure which sees player handle items, interact with characters, and solve puzzles to advance through the story.

Reception
Tap-Repeatedly/Four Fat Chicks gave the game 80/100, writing "There's nothing groundbreaking here, no radical new interface or slick engine, no strikingly addictive gaming paradigms. Just a cool old-school adventure with good puzzles, fun characters and lots of eye candy."

Adventure Classic Gaming gave the game 3 stars, saying "Overall, the combination of simple puzzles, appealing visual style, and the distinct style of humor make Chewy: Esc from F5 a good game for young players who are just getting into adventure gaming".

Home of the Underdogs wrote "Chewy is a fun but sadly unknown cartoon adventure in the style of LucasArts' classic Day of the Tentacle but with plenty of charms on its own. You play Chewy, a cute little alien (and very pink) who is out to rescue his friend who's been captured by the evil Borks. The puzzles, while not as creative as in DOTT, are quite zany (along the way you must capture a ghost, and write a best-selling novel) and fun to solve. Overall, a fun adventure that shouldn't be missed."

References

External links
 

1995 video games
Adventure games
DOS games
Point-and-click adventure games
ScummVM-supported games
Video games about extraterrestrial life
Video games developed in the United Kingdom
Windows games